Rachala (coordinates ), is a village in Addakal Mandal in Mahbubnagar District of Telangana State, India. It belongs to the Telangana region. Telugu is the local language here. As of 2011, the total population of Rachala is 3772. Males are 1886 and females are 1865 living in 746 houses. The total area of Rachala is 1748 hectares and has a literacy rate of 46.8%

References

Villages in Mahbubnagar district